Stacey Wooley (born April 21, 1968) is an Dartmouth graduate and American biathlete. She competed in the three events at the 1998 Winter Olympics.

Career

1998 Winter Olympics 
She competed in the three events at the 1998 Winter Olympics.

Later life 
She later competed on the World Cup circuit from 1992 - 2002. After she finished competing in Germany, she worked as a lifestyle trainer at Oxygym Wellness in Traunstein from 2002 - 04.

In 2004 she moved back to Park City, Utah where she worked various jobs until becoming an associate director of high performance Paralympic winter sports for the US Olympic Committee. Wooley further went on to become the director of development for the US Ski and Snowboard Hall of Fame and Museum in Park City in 2014.

References

External links
 

1968 births
Living people
Biathletes at the 1998 Winter Olympics
American female biathletes
Olympic biathletes of the United States
People from Lebanon, New Hampshire
21st-century American women